On January 21, 2022, several Islamic State gunmen raided an Iraqi Army base in rural al-Azim district, Diyala Governorate. At least 11 Iraqi soldiers were killed in their sleep.

The attacks began at around 3:00 AM when the gunmen entered the barracks, proceeding to gun down sleeping soldiers before the ISIL terrorists left. Eleven people, ten soldiers and one lieutenant, Zargham Luay, were killed in total. Islamic State later claimed responsibility for the attack via Telegram. The Iraqi federal government immediately condemned the incident, launching a retaliatory airstrike against ISIL targets south of Hatra in response. Barham Salih, former prime minister of the Kurdistan Region, also condemned the ISIL terrorist attacks.

The massacre was condemned by the governments of Iraqi Kurdistan, Turkey, and the United Arab Emirates. Iraqi Kurdish president Nechirvan Barzani held a telephone call with Iraqi Prime Minister Mustafa Al-Kadhimi in which he denounced the attack and extended empathy to the people of Iraq. On January 25, 2022, the United Nations Security Council voted to condemn the killings. The UN-released document is available in three languages: English, Arabic, and Kurdish.

Notes

References

Massacres in 2022
2022 mass shootings in Asia
2022 murders in Iraq
21st-century mass murder in Iraq
2022 massacre
ISIL terrorist incidents in Iraq
Islamic terrorist incidents in 2022
January 2022 crimes in Asia
Massacres in Iraq
Massacres perpetrated by ISIL
Terrorist incidents in Iraq in 2022
Attacks on military installations in the 2020s
Terrorism in 2022